Carl M. Vogel (March 7, 1955 – April 14, 2016) was a Republican member of the Missouri Senate, United States, who represented the 6th District from 2003 through 2011. Previously he was a member of the Missouri House of Representatives from 1991 through 2000.

He graduated from Helias High School in his native Jefferson City, Missouri, and later from the University of Missouri at Columbia, with a Bachelor of Arts degree. He and his wife, Kimberly, have two children, Jacob and Kristen.

He was the manager of the Jefferson City Coca-Cola Bottling Company. He was a member of the St. Joseph Cathedral, the Lions International, the Jaycees, the Roman Catholic men's organization, the Knights of Columbus, and Rotary International.

He had previously served as the Jefferson City Housing Authority Commissioner. While in the Missouri Senate, Vogel served as the chair of the Way and Means Committee, vice chair of the Small Business, Insurance and Industrial Relations Committee, and a member of the Economic Development, Tourism and Local Government Committee. Vogel died on April 14, 2016, at Barnes-Jewish Hospital, in St. Louis, from pancreatic cancer.

References

Official Manual, State of Missouri, 2005-2006.  Jefferson City, MO:Secretary of State, 2005.

External links
Missouri Senate - Carl M. Vogel 'official government website
Project Vote Smart - Carl M. Vogel
Follow the Money - Carl M. Vogel
2006 2004 2002 2000 1998 1996 campaign contributions

1955 births
2016 deaths
Republican Party Missouri state senators
Republican Party members of the Missouri House of Representatives
People from Jefferson City, Missouri
University of Missouri alumni
Businesspeople from Missouri
Deaths from pancreatic cancer
20th-century Roman Catholics
21st-century Roman Catholics
21st-century American politicians
21st-century American businesspeople
Catholics from Missouri
20th-century American businesspeople